No Sleep til Shanghai is a 2007 biographical documentary film. It stars rap musician Jin Au-Yeung, and was directed by Todd Angkasuwan. The documentary is about the life and career of Jin Au-Yeung, and how he overcame racial barriers in the rap industry.

Synopsis
The film follows Jin and his crew as they tour Asia to promote Jin's debut album; The Rest is History. At the start, Jin was riding the notoriety of winning the weekly Freestyle Friday rap battle on BET's 106 and Park for seven consecutive weeks. The film documents how Jin became the first Asian American rapper to sign a recording deal with a major label when he signed with Virgin Records (Ruff Ryders). The film offers a glimpse into the life of a rapper, as well as the growing hip hop communities in Asian cities such as Hong Kong, Shanghai, Taipei, and Tokyo.

Awards and nominations
 Atlanta Hip Hop Film Festival - Best Documentary (nominee)
 San Francisco Int'l Asian American Film Festival - Best Documentary (nominee)

External links
 Official website

2007 films
Documentary films about hip hop music and musicians
American documentary films
Documentary films about Asian Americans
2000s English-language films
2000s American films